Le Vignon-en-Quercy ("Le-Vignon-in-Quercy") is a commune in the Lot department in Southwestern France. It was established on 1 January 2019 by merger of the former communes of Les Quatre-Routes-du-Lot (the seat) and Cazillac. Les Quatre-Routes station has rail connections to Brive-la-Gaillarde, Aurillac, Figeac and Rodez.

See also
Communes of the Lot department

References

Communes of Lot (department)